Nicolas Robert Michel Godemèche (born 22 June 1984 in Marseille) is a French former footballer who played as a defensive midfielder.

Honours
Cluj
Liga I: 2011–12

References

External links

1984 births
Living people
Footballers from Marseille
French footballers
Association football midfielders
Ligue 1 players
Ligue 2 players
Montpellier HSC players
Stade de Reims players
Primeira Liga players
Associação Naval 1º de Maio players
Liga I players
CFR Cluj players
Belgian Pro League players
S.K. Beveren players
French expatriate footballers
Expatriate footballers in Portugal
Expatriate footballers in Romania
Expatriate footballers in Belgium
French expatriate sportspeople in Portugal
French expatriate sportspeople in Romania
French expatriate sportspeople in Belgium